KLB is a rock group/boy band from Brazil.

KLB may also refer to:
 KLB (2000 album), their debut album
 Kalabo Airport, Zambia
 Kenya Literature Bureau, a Kenyan publisher
 Kiliwa language
 Kinlochbervie Camanachd Club, a Scottish shinty club
 Kiraoli railway station, Agra district, Uttar Pradesh, India
 KLB Club, a name adopted by Allied airmen at Buchenwald concentration camp
 Klebsazolicin, a peptide antibiotic
 β-klotho, encoded by the KLB gene